José Alfredo Zúñiga (born 2 October 1985) is a Mexican professional boxer.

Professional career

Zúñiga will fight Alberto Rossel for the WBA interim light flyweight title.

References

External links

Boxers from Tamaulipas
People from Matamoros, Tamaulipas
Light-flyweight boxers
1985 births
Living people
Mexican male boxers